Amelia Curran may refer to:

Amelia Curran (painter), Irish painter
Amelia Curran (musician), Canadian singer-songwriter